Rafael Campos (13 May 1936 – 9 July 1985) was an actor from the Dominican Republic whose credits include Blackboard Jungle (1955), Dino (1957), The Light in the Forest (1958), Slumber Party '57 (1976), The Astro-Zombies (1968), Centennial (1978) and V (1983). He was briefly married to blues singer and pianist Dinah Washington.

Background
Originally from the Dominican Republic, he moved to the United States in 1949.
From 1961 to 1962, he was married to Dinah Washington, who was 12 years his senior. In 1961, Jet magazine published a photo with Washington embracing both Campos, reportedly her seventh husband, and her ex-husband Eddie Chamblee, reportedly her fifth husband. He then married the model Sally Boyd, with whom he had two daughters.

He was diagnosed with stomach cancer and entered hospital in December 1984. He died on 10 July 1985, aged 49. He was survived by his two daughters, five brothers and three sisters.

One of Campos's brothers is the cryptographer, artist, and poet Luis Campos; another brother, Fernando Campos, is the president of New York's Latin ACE awards.

Career
Campos had a career that lasted 30 years. He was spotted by the director Richard Brooks during a theater production of Heavenly Express. Thanks to Brooks, he had a starring role alongside Vic Morrow, Margaret Hayes and Sidney Poitier in the 1955 film Blackboard Jungle. In the 1955 film Trial, he played the part of a Chicano teenager wrongfully accused of murdering a white girl from a rich family at a beach party. He is being defended by a college law instructor, played by Glenn Ford.
Other appearances include an episode of Have Gun – Will Travel, playing a teenager who stole a statue of St. Francis of Assisi. During the 1960s, he was in the Ted V. Mikels-directed film The Astro-Zombies, which starred John Carradine, Wendell Corey and Tura Satana. He played the part of Juan.

Among his TV credits is a 1962 appearance on Alfred Hitchcock Presents, titled “The Big Score.” He also played a young Mexican boy, Juan De La O, who stole a horse in an episode of Laramie (season 3, episode 15), titled "The Barefoot Kid". He played the lead as a teen gang member who kills and robs a man who turns out to be a mob boss. Rafael had a memorable role in an episode of All In the Family where Archie is told to lay off part of his crew at work and from 1977 to 1978, the actor had a recurring role as Ramon Diaz Jr. in the series Rhoda. He appeared in 10 episodes of the show. 

Possibly his last credited film role was in 1986 in The Return of Josey Wales, in which he played Chato.

Death
Campos died of stomach cancer on July 9, 1985, at the Motion Picture and Television Hospital in Woodland Hills, Los Angeles, California.

Filmography

References

External links
 

Dominican Republic male actors
American male actors
Dominican Republic expatriates in the United States
1936 births
1985 deaths
Western (genre) television actors
Burials at Valley Oaks Memorial Park
Deaths from cancer in California
Deaths from stomach cancer